The Poundmaker Cree Nation is a Cree First Nations band government, whose reserve community is located near Cut Knife, Saskatchewan. It is a Treaty 6 nation, started by the famous Cree Chief Pitikwahanapiwiyin. The band has 1281 members with 505 living on the reserve. Its location is Northwest of North Battleford and Saskatoon.  Poundmaker Cree Nation is home to the Battle of Cut Knife National Historic Site of Canada. Veteran actor Gordon Tootoosis was born in Poundmaker.

Reserves
Poundmaker Cree Nation has reserved for itself several reserves:

 Poundmaker 114
 Poundmaker 114-1A
 Poundmaker 114-2A
 Poundmaker 114-2B
 Poundmaker 114-2C
 Poundmaker 114-3A
 Poundmaker 114-3B
 Poundmaker 114-4A
 Poundmaker 114-5A
 Poundmaker 114-5B
 Poundmaker 114-6A2
 Poundmaker 114-6A3
 Poundmaker 114-6B2
 Poundmaker 114-6C2
 Poundmaker 114-7A
 Poundmaker 114-8A
 Poundmaker 114-9
 Poundmaker 114-9A
 Poundmaker 114-10A
 Poundmaker 114-11A
 Poundmaker 114-12
 Poundmaker 114-13
 Poundmaker 114-15
 Poundmaker 114-15C
 Poundmaker 114-16
 Poundmaker 114-17
 Poundmaker 114-17A
 Poundmaker 114-18A
 Poundmaker 114-18B
 Poundmaker 114-19
 Poundmaker 114-21
 Poundmaker 114-22
 Poundmaker 114-28
 Poundmaker 114-29

References

External links

Cree governments
First Nations governments in Saskatchewan